Vlado Glođović (Serbian Cyrillic: Владо Глођовић; born 8 November 1976) is a Serbian international referee who refereed at 2014 FIFA World Cup qualifiers.

References

1976 births
Living people
Serbian football referees